The Southern Utah Thunderbirds are the varsity athletic teams representing Southern Utah University in Cedar City, Utah in intercollegiate athletics. The university sponsors seventeen teams including six men’s sports: basketball, cross country, football, golf, and track and field and nine women's sports: basketball, cross country, golf, gymnastics, soccer, softball, track and field, and volleyball. The baseball program was dropped after the 2011–12 season. The Thunderbirds compete in NCAA Division I and joined the Big Sky Conference on July 1, 2012 after departing from The Summit League.

In 2022, the Thunderbirds left the Big Sky Conference and joined the Western Athletic Conference.

Varsity sports
A member of the Western Athletic Conference. SUU sponsors teams in six men's and nine women's NCAA sanctioned sports.

References

External links